"Heart of Gold" is a song by Slovene duo BQL. It was written by Raay, Marjetka Vovk and Anej Piletič. This is their second single released on 18 February 2017. The song peaked at number 1 on the Slovenian Singles Chart.

Formats and track listings 

Digital download
"Heart of Gold" – 2:50

Credits and personnel 

 Anej Piletič – lyrics, guitar, vocals 
 Raay – music, producer
 Marjetka Vovk – music
 Rok Piletič – vocals

Charts

Weekly charts

Year-end charts

Release history

References 

2017 songs
2017 singles